Şərəfxanlı (also, Şərəfxanli and Sharafkhanly) is a village and municipality in the Aghjabadi Rayon of Azerbaijan.  It has a population of 725.

References 

Populated places in Aghjabadi District